Karl Wilhelm Johann Schwitalle (12 April 1906 – 7 February 1945) was a Polish born German male weightlifter, who competed in the lightweight class and represented Germany at international competitions. He won the bronze medal at the 1938 World Weightlifting Championships in the 67.5 kg category. He participated at the 1936 Summer Olympics in the 67.5 kg event finishing fourth.

He was killed in action during World War II.

References

External links
 

1906 births
1945 deaths
German male weightlifters
World Weightlifting Championships medalists
Sportspeople from Wrocław
Olympic weightlifters of Germany
Weightlifters at the 1936 Summer Olympics
German military personnel killed in World War II